Independence Township is a township in Beaver County, Pennsylvania, United States. The population was 2,242 at the 2020 census. It is part of the Pittsburgh metropolitan area.

Geography
Independence Township is located in the southeastern portion of Beaver County.

Recreation
A portion of Raccoon Creek State Park and a portion of the Pennsylvania State Game Lands Number 189 is located at the western end of Independence Township.

Surrounding neighborhoods
Independence Township has four borders, including the townships of Hanover to the west, Raccoon to the northwest, Hopewell to the northeast and Findlay (Allegheny County) to the southeast.

Demographics

As of the census of 2000, there were 2,802 people, 1,007 households, and 785 families residing in the township.  The population density was 122.5 people per square mile (47.3/km2).  There were 1,069 housing units at an average density of 46.7/sq mi (18.0/km2).  The racial makeup of the township was 97.82% White, 0.18% African American, 0.11% Native American, 0.18% from other races, and 1.71% from two or more races. Hispanic or Latino of any race were 0.61% of the population.

There were 1,007 households, out of which 38.7% had children under the age of 18 living with them, 64.1% were married couples living together, 9.4% had a female householder with no husband present, and 22.0% were non-families. 17.9% of all households were made up of individuals, and 5.1% had someone living alone who was 65 years of age or older.  The average household size was 2.78 and the average family size was 3.17.

In the township the population was spread out, with 27.6% under the age of 18, 6.6% from 18 to 24, 32.4% from 25 to 44, 23.7% from 45 to 64, and 9.7% who were 65 years of age or older.  The median age was 37 years. For every 100 females there were 102.7 males.  For every 100 females age 18 and over, there were 102.0 males.

The median income for a household in the township was $40,372, and the median income for a family was $47,153. Males had a median income of $34,911 versus $27,045 for females. The per capita income for the township was $17,946.  About 5.1% of families and 7.7% of the population were below the poverty line, including 10.3% of those under age 18 and 2.9% of those age 65 or over.

References

External links
Township website

Populated places established in 1848
Townships in Beaver County, Pennsylvania